Johannes Bobrowski (originally Johannes Konrad Bernhard Bobrowski; 9 April 1917 – 2 September 1965) was a German lyric poet, narrative writer, adaptor and essayist.

Life
Bobrowski was born on 9 April 1917 in Tilsit in East Prussia. In 1925, he moved first to Rastenburg, then in 1928 on to Königsberg, where he attended the Gymnasium. One of his teachers was Ernst Wiechert. In 1937, he started a degree in art history at the Humboldt University in Berlin. As a member of the Confessing Church, Bobrowski had contact with the German resistance against National Socialism. He was a lance corporal for the entire Second World War in Poland, France and the Soviet Union. In 1943 he married Johanna Buddrus.

From 1945 to 1949 Bobrowski was imprisoned by the Soviet Union, where he spent time working in a coal mine. On his release, he returned home to his family in the  suburban Berlin district of Friedrichshagen, in the Soviet occupation sector of Berlin. He worked as an editor, first for the Altberliner Verlag, a children's publisher run by Lucie Grosner, and then, from 1959 on, for the Union Verlag publishing house.

Bobrowski's work was influenced by his knowledge of Eastern European landscapes and of the German, Baltic, and Slavic cultures and languages, combined with ancient myths. His first poems were published during the war, in 1944, in the Munich-based journal Das innere Reich.

In 1960 he read his poems at a meeting in Aschaffenburg, Bavaria, of the influential  West German literary association Group 47 (Gruppe 47). The following year his first book of collected poems, Sarmatische Zeit (Sarmatian Times), was published in both West and East Germany. After having missed the fall 1961 meeting of the Group 47, since it took place just after the building of the Berlin Wall, he was able to attend the subsequent meeting, held in October 1962 at the Wannsee, in West Berlin. On that occasion he read seven poems from those that would later appear in his collection Wetterzeichen (Weather signs), and was awarded the group's prestigious literary prize.

In 1964, Bobrowski became a member of the PEN Club.

Bobrowski died as a result of a perforated appendix in East Berlin on 2 September 1965, and was buried in the Friedrichshagen cemetery. Since 1992, the Foundation for Prussian Maritime Trade (Stiftung Preußische Seehandlung) has donated funds towards the Johannes Brobrowski Medal.

Literary works
 Sarmatische Zeit (The Land of Sarmatia), poems, 1961
 Schattenland Ströme (Shadowland), poems, 1962
 Levins Mühle, 34 Sätze über meinen Großvater (Levin's Mill,34 Stories About My Grandfather ) novel, 1964
 Boehlendorff und Mäusefest, Short stories, 1965
 Litauische Claviere (Lithuanian Pianos), novel, 1966
 Wetterzeichen (Weathersigns), poems, 1967
 Der Mahner" (The Admonisher), short stories, 1967  translated by Marc Linder into English with "Boehlendorff und Mausefest" as "I Taste Bitterness" in 1970
 Im Windgesträuch (In the windy wilderness), poems chosen by Bobrowski's literary executor, 1970
 Shadowlands Selected Poems translated by Ruth Mead & Matthew Mead, 1984

Films
 Levins Mühle (Levin's Mill), filmed in 1980 by Horst Seemann for DEFA film studios, with Erwin Geschonnek, Christian Grashof and Katja Paryla. 
 Grüsse aus Sarmatien für den Dichter Johannes Bobrowski  (Greetings from Sarmatia for the Poet Johannes Bobrowski),1973 – Short film by Volker Koepp

Opera
 Levins Mühle (Levin's Mill) by Udo Zimmermann, premiere in 1973, produced by Harry Kupfer

Prizes
 Alma Johanna Koenig Prize, 1962 
 "Group 47" prize, 1962 
 Heinrich Mann Prize, 1965, for Levins Mühle (Levin's Mill)
 International Charles Veillon Prize, 1965 
 F. C. Weiskopf Prize, 1967

About Bobrowski and his work 
 Dietmar Albrecht, Andreas Degen et al. (eds): Unverschmerzt. Johannes Bobrowski – Leben und Werk. Munich 2004. 
 Andreas Degen: Bildgedächtnis. Zur poetischen Funktion der Sinneswahrnehmung im Prosawerk Johannes Bobrowskis. Berlin 2004. 
 Sabine Egger: Dialog mit dem Fremden. Erinnerung an den "europäischen Osten" in der Lyrik Johannes Bobrowskis. Würzburg 2009.  
 Eberhard Haufe: Bobrowski-Chronik. Daten zu Leben und Werk. Würzburg 1994. 
 Christoph Meckel: Erinnerung an Johannes Bobrowski. Munich, Vienna 1989. 
 Bernd Leistner: Johannes Bobrowski – Studien und Interpretationen. Berlin 1981 
 Gerhard Rostin (ed.): Ahornallee 26 oder Epitaph für Johannes Bobrowski. Stuttgart 1978.  
 Gerhard Rostin (ed.) Johannes Bobrowski – Selbstzeugnisse und neue Beiträge über sein Werk. Berlin 1975 
 Gerhard Wolf: Beschreibung eines Zimmers – 15 Kapitel über Johannes Bobrowski. Berlin 1975, Stuttgart 1972 
 Gerhard Wolf: Johannes Bobrowski – Leben und Werk. Berlin 1967 
 A more extensive bibliography can be found on  Die Johannes Bobrowski Gesellschaft e.V.

References

External links
 Die Johannes Bobrowski Gesellschaft e.V. 

1917 births
1965 deaths
People from Tilsit
People from East Prussia
German Protestants
Christian Democratic Union (East Germany) politicians
East German writers
German-language poets
German male poets
German Army soldiers of World War II
German prisoners of war in World War II held by the Soviet Union
Heinrich Mann Prize winners